The Revolution of 1772 also known as The Bloodless Revolution, also known as the Coup of Gustav III ( or older Gustav III:s statsvälvning) was a Swedish coup d'état performed by King Gustav III of Sweden on 19 August 1772 to introduce a division of power between the king and the Riksdag of the Estates, resulting in the end of the Age of Liberty and the introduction of the Swedish Constitution of 1772.

See also
 Hovpartiet
 Coup of 1756
 December Crisis (1768)
 Coup of 1809

References

 Beth Hennings, Gustav III: En biografi (1957), Norstedts förlag 1990 
 Berättelser ur svenska historien / 42. Frihetstidens sista år och Revolutionen 1772

18th-century coups d'état and coup attempts
18th century in Sweden
Conflicts in 1772
1772 in Sweden
18th century in Stockholm
Sweden during the Age of Liberty
Sweden during the Gustavian era
Gustav III